The East Zone 2 is an Administrative Zone of São Paulo, Brazil.

References

Geography of São Paulo